Clenoliximab (INN) is a monoclonal antibody against CD4. It acts as an immunomodulator and has been investigated for the treatment of rheumatoid arthritis.
The drug is a chimeric antibody from Macaca irus and Homo sapiens.

References 

Monoclonal antibodies
Experimental drugs